The Shangani Patrol was a patrol of the British South Africa Company that was ambushed by Matabele warriors in 1893.

Shangani Patrol may also refer to:
 Shangani Patrol (film), a 1970 war film
 Shangani Patrol (soundtrack album)